{{Infobox rail service
| name = Chennai Egmore–Jodhpur Express
| image = JU - MS Exp. (24563340784).jpg
| image_width = 250px
| caption = Jodhpur–Chennai Egmore Express at Ammanabrolu
| type = Superfast
| locale = 
| first = 
| last =
| operator = Southern Railway zone
| ridership =
| start =  (MS)
| stops = 25 
| end =  (''')
| distance = 
| frequency = Weekly 
| class = AC 2 tier, AC 3 tier, Sleeper class, General Unreserved
| seating = No
| sleeping = Yes
| autorack = 
| catering =  Yes
| observation = ICF coach
| entertainment = No
| baggage = No
| other facilities= Below the seats
| stock = 2
| gauge = 
| electrification = 
| trainnumber = 22663/22664
| speed = 
| map = 
| map_state =
}}

It is currently being operated with 22663/22664 train numbers on a weekly basis.

Service

The 22663/Chennai Egmore–Jodhpur Express has an average speed of 55 km/hr and covers 2352 km in 42h 45m. The 22664/Jodhpur–Chennai Egmore Expresshas averages speed of 55 km/hr and covers 2352 km in 42h 45m.

Route and halts 

The important halts of the train are:

Coach composition

The train has standard ICF rakes with max speed of 110 kmph. The train consists of 24 coaches:

 1 AC Two Tier
 5 AC Three Tier
 12 Sleeper coaches
 4 General Unreserved
 2 Seating cum Luggage Rake

See also 

 Chennai Egmore railway station
 Jodhpur Junction railway station
 Chennai Egmore–Nagercoil Weekly Superfast Express

Notes

References

External links 

 22663/Chennai Egmore–Jodhpur Superfast Express
 22664/Jodhpur–Chennai Egmore Superfast Express

Transport in Chennai
Transport in Jodhpur
Express trains in India
Rail transport in Tamil Nadu
Rail transport in Andhra Pradesh
Rail transport in Telangana
Rail transport in Maharashtra
Rail transport in Gujarat
Rail transport in Rajasthan
Railway services introduced in 2002